Borealis Alliance is an alliance among the north-west European Air Navigation Service Providers. Three Functional airspace blocks are part of the Alliance - IRL/UK, DK/SE & NEFAB - most members already cooperate in Noracon.

Overview 
The ANSP Alliance that enables its Members to drive better performance for stakeholders through business collaboration.

Legal basis 
The Alliance agreement defines how these close competitors will work together.

Funding and Budget 
The Alliance shares costs.

Members 
The members of the Borealis Alliance are:
Avinor
EANS
Finavia
IAA
ISAVIA
Latvijas Gaisa Satiksme (LGS)
LFV
NATS
Naviair

External links 
 NORACON

Air traffic control in Europe